Slaughter Pen may refer to battle locations where, as with an animal killing area at a slaughterhouse, military troops with little defense are "caught in a slaughter pen on some disastrous field with a sacrifice" in a short period:
Slaughter Pen (Cold Harbor), during the Battle of Cold Harbor
Slaughter Pen (Gettysburg Battlefield), during the Battle of Gettysburg
Slaughter Pen (Stones River), during the Battle of Stones River
Slaughter Pen Farm (Fredericksburg and Spotsylvania National Military Park), a 
Floating Battery of Charleston Harbor, nicknamed "the slaughter pen"